Nicolas Kiesa (born 3 March 1978) is a Danish racing driver. He participated in five Formula One Grands Prix in the 2003 season, scoring no championship points, but finishing every race.

Previously, he had won the 2003 Formula 3000 race at Monaco, when Björn Wirdheim slowed on the last lap on the front straight to greet his team.

He returned to Formula One in 2005, replacing Robert Doornbos as Jordan's third driver for the German Grand Prix and for the rest of the season.

Formula One
Kiesa drove for the Minardi team for five races in 2003, taking the seat vacated after Justin Wilson moved to Jaguar. He made his debut in the German Grand Prix at Hockenheim, which he finished in 12th position. Kiesa finished all five races, his best result being 11th in the USA Grand Prix at Indianapolis, but did not outqualify his teammate Jos Verstappen at any race.

Racing record

Complete International Formula 3000 results
(key) (Races in bold indicate pole position; races in italics indicate fastest lap.)

Complete Formula One results
(key)

Complete DTM results
(key)

Complete 24 Hours of Le Mans results

References

External links 

 Profile at grandprix.com

 

1978 births
Living people
Danish racing drivers
Danish Formula One drivers
Minardi Formula One drivers
Deutsche Tourenwagen Masters drivers
International Formula 3000 drivers
Formula Ford drivers
24 Hours of Le Mans drivers
American Le Mans Series drivers
European Le Mans Series drivers
Sportspeople from Copenhagen
Danish people of Italian descent

Aston Martin Racing drivers
Kolles Racing drivers
Audi Sport drivers
Super Nova Racing drivers
RC Motorsport drivers